Roswell Keyes Colcord (April 25, 1839 – October 30, 1939) was an American politician. He served as the seventh Governor  of Nevada from 1891 to 1895. He was a member of the Republican Party.

Biography
Colcord was born on April 25, 1839 in Searsport, Maine. He attended public schools where he studied Mechanical Engineering and he found work in a shipyard as a carpenter. He married Mary E. Hopkins on April 28, 1868, in Virginia City, Nevada, and they had three children, Stella, Harry, and Ethel.

Career
Colcord moved west to California in 1856, to Aurora, Nevada in 1860, and to Virginia City, Nevada in 1863. He became a successful mining engineer. He also set up a law practice and became one of the top attorneys in the state. He was also involved in the building of bridges and mills. He was selected as a commissioner to represent Nevada at the Paris Expedition in 1889.

Elected as governor in 1890, Colcord strengthened the state's economy and also signed the state's first admissions day bill. He was the first Nevada governor to support Women's Suffrage. During his tenure, a state board of health was established, a mechanical engineering department was initiated in the University of Nevada, and a first state board of equalization was authorized.

After his term as governor, Colcord was named Superintendent of the United States Mint's Carson City Mint, a position he held from 1898 to 1911. At that time, the Mint did not produce money, but was a shipping point for bullion.

Death
Colcord was in relatively good health at the time of his death on October 30, 1939, at the age of 100 in Carson City, Nevada. He is interred at the Lone Mountain Cemetery in Carson City, Nevada.

References

External links
 
 Nevada State Library and Archives
 Roswell K. Colcord, at The Political Graveyard
The Encyclopedia of Nevada
Nevada's First Ladies
National Governors Association

1839 births
1939 deaths
American centenarians
Republican Party governors of Nevada
Men centenarians
Politicians from Carson City, Nevada
People from Searsport, Maine
United States Mint